A Nightmare on Elm Street is a video game released on the Nintendo Entertainment System in 1990 based on Wes Craven's slasher film of the same name. The game was developed by Rare and published by LJN. It should not be confused with an unrelated game with the same title for the Commodore 64 and IBM PC released in 1989.

Gameplay
The player takes on the role of an ordinary teenager. Additional teenagers can be controlled by up to three other players with the use of the NES Four Score. The objective is to scour the vicinity of Elm Street, collect the bones of the supernatural serial killer Freddy Krueger and dispose of them in the local high school's furnace.

A Nightmare on Elm Street is a horizontal side-scrolling beat 'em up. The game's environment is inhabited by hostile characters, such as zombies, cats, dogs, skeletons, bats, rats, spiders and minotaurs, that will attack the player character. Being attacked a certain number of times will cause the player to lose a life. Because the game takes place around midnight, certain areas are initially locked off from the player and require a key to be collected for later access. Within the individual buildings, the player must collect the bones scattered throughout the level before being able to leave. When all the bones are collected, a boss battle with Freddy will commence. Defeating Freddy will both allow the player to exit the area and earn the player a key that allows access to a new area.

A game mechanic unique to the title is the "Sleep Meter". The meter indicates how close the player character is to falling asleep. If even one of the player characters falls asleep, all of the player characters will be transported to an alternate version of the environment referred to as the "Dream World", where the player is more vulnerable to attacks from Freddy. The Sleep Meter decreases automatically, but does so at a slower pace when the player character stays in motion. The Sleep Meter can be increased by collecting cups of coffee scattered throughout the levels. When in the Dream World, the player character can be returned to the default version of the level by collecting the boombox placed somewhere within the level. Collecting certain icons grants the player characters special powers while they're within the Dream World, namely the ability to throw shurikens, javelins or magic projectiles.

Development
According to the game magazine Nintendo Power, the original concept of this game varied greatly from what was eventually released. In the original game concept, the players would control Freddy Krueger and should kill the teenagers who were attempting to gather his scattered bones in order to rebury them.

Follows the synopsis of the prototype version of the game:

It is assumed that this version of the game had been cancelled to prevent controversy. Years earlier, a video game adaptation of the movie The Texas Chain Saw Massacre had been released for the Atari 2600, where the player controls the murderer with the objective to chase and kill victims. The game was a financial failure because many sellers refused to sell it, fearing reprisals.

Reception

Chris Bieniek of VideoGames & Computer Entertainment called A Nightmare on Elm Street unusually good for a film-based game, praising its "smooth, quick, and responsive" controls, and strong presentation, highlighting the "movielike wavering of the screen" that occurs when entering the dream world.

Its graphics and music were also positively commented on in retrospective reviews, which were more mixed on the gameplay. The Video Game Critic claimed that although A Nightmare on Elm Street was "standard platform fare," it was made somewhat engaging by an atmosphere that reflected the movies and a sleep meter aspect that the publication positively compared to the material-and-spectral-realm system of Legacy of Kain: Soul Reaver (1999). Writing in retrospect in 2010, an IGN journalist was mixed towards the game, praising its sleep meter element but also feeling it was a "low-rent Castlevania with a great but bizarrely weak super-villain."

Reviews from GameCola and Defunct Games noted unfair difficulty, with the absence of a health bar a frequent note. Adam Wallace of Defunct Games disliked the random order of stages, "unavoidable hazards," and bosses featuring "cheap" hits, while GameCola panned the challenge disparity between the dream and awake worlds: "The dream warrior’s have projectile attacks, but you can’t always use them. For the most part you’re forced to fight enemies with your stubby arm that reach just far enough to get you killed any time you fight something." Wallace also felt the bosses did not take enough advantage of concepts from the films: "Why not have Freddy take some of the forms from the movies like the snake from Dream Warriors, the comic book supervillain from Dream Master, or the demented chef from Dream Child? Hell, I wouldn't even have minded the ridiculous stuff from Freddy's Dead!"

Legacy
In 2013, NECA released a GameStop exclusive figure of the Nintendo-style Freddy Krueger, similar to their Nintendo-style Jason Voorhees figure based on LJN's 1988Friday the 13th game.

See also
 Friday the 13th (NES video game)

Notes

References

Citations

Bibliography 
 

1990 video games
A Nightmare on Elm Street (franchise) mass media
LJN games
Nintendo Entertainment System games
Nintendo Entertainment System-only games
North America-exclusive video games
Platform games
Rare (company) games
Video games based on films
Video games scored by David Wise
Video games set in Ohio
Video games about nightmares
Video games about ghosts
1990s horror video games
Video games developed in the United Kingdom